The 1896 Oklahoma Sooners football team represented the University of Oklahoma as an independent during the 1896 college football season. In their second year of football, the Sooners compiled a 2–0 record (both against Norman High School) and cumulatively outscored the Tigers by a combined total of 28 to 4.

Schedule

Roster

References

Oklahoma
Oklahoma Sooners football seasons
College football undefeated seasons
Oklahoma Sooners football